Lake Jasper is a permanent freshwater lake in the South West area of Western Australia. The lake is the largest freshwater lake in Western Australia.  It has evidence of Aboriginal activity within its bounds.

The lake is located on a flat sandy plain, the Scott Coastal Plain, with a high dune ridge to the west and the Donnelly River to the east. The lake is contained within the boundaries of the D'Entrecasteaux National Park.
The camp site has seating facilities on the eastern side of the lake, but is subject to a complete fire ban and forbids vehicle access to the shoreline; the camp site is only accessible by four-wheel drive vehicles.

Lake Jasper has two smaller lakes located to the east: Lake Wilson and Lake Smith. All of these bodies are part of the Donnelly River catchment area and they all are inhabited by all of the regions endemic freshwater fish species.
The lake has significant floristic value as it supports an extensive area of tall sedgeland. The area is also an important habitat for fish, waterbirds, invertebrates and frogs.

The lake is known as a White Water Lake as the lack of tannic acid in the water allows good light dispersion. The lake water is of a high quality and high quality artesian water also exists in the area.

An archaeological site is located at the lake, the only known example of a submerged Aboriginal site. Examination by Charles Dortch and others of the Western Australian Museum, in consultation with maritime archaeologists and the Nyungar community, produced reports that provide insights for a number of other disciplines and interests. The excavations have found stone implements and samples of tree stumps on the floor of the lake, that show an extensive period of occupancy and use of the lake's resources by the first peoples of the region.
 
Lake Jasper was named in memory of Jasper Taylor Molloy Bussell (18631864), son of Alfred and Ellen Bussell.

See also

 List of lakes of Western Australia

References 

Jasper
D'Entrecasteaux National Park